The economy of Greater Cleveland is diverse, but is based on healthcare, banking, finance, education, insurance, manufacturing, sports, and tech. The metropolitan area based in Cleveland is the 33rd largest in the country, and is home to over 2 million people.

History

Cleveland was founded in 1796 by Moses Cleaveland and his followers. In the early 19th Century, farmers came to Cleveland to sell their goods. The building of the Erie Canal helped grow the region as well as its economy. In the 1860s, the Standard Oil Company was founded by John D. Rockefeller in the city of Cleveland. In the early 20th century, about a quarter of the region's jobs were in steel mills. The Great Depression hurt the area's economy and caused up to 35% unemployment rate. The City of Cleveland went into default in 1978 and was $30 million in debt. The area's economy improved during the 1990s. However, The Great Recession hindered the region as the City of Cleveland's unemployment rate hit 12%. Since then, the state of the metro area's economy has improved. The GDP of the region is at about $138 billion.

Largest employers
As of 2014, these are the largest employers in the Cleveland Metro Area.

Fortune 500 companies
The following is a list of companies on the Fortune 500 list that have corporate headquarters in Greater Cleveland as of 2019 
 
 99. Progressive Insurance, Headquartered in Mayfield
 177. Sherwin-Williams, Headquartered in Cleveland
 218. Parker Hannifin, Headquartered in Cleveland
 413. Key Corp, Headquartered in Cleveland
 433. Travel Centers of America, Headquartered in Westlake

Banking
Key Bank is headquartered in Cleveland's tallest building, the Key Tower. Key employs nearly 5,000 people in Greater Cleveland. There are many banks with a presence in the Cleveland Metro Area, including Fifth-Third Bank, U.S. Bank, Bank of America, PNC, Dollar Bank, Chase, and Huntington. The Federal Reserve Bank of Cleveland was built in 1923, a time when Cleveland's population was nearly twice the size today. Third Federal S&L is also a major bank in Cleveland.

Education
Greater Cleveland is home to several higher education institutions. These include Case Western Reserve University, Cleveland State University, Cuyahoga Community College, Oberlin College, Baldwin Wallace University, Notre Dame College, and John Carroll University. These places employ approximately 9,600 people. There are an estimated 142 High Schools in the Greater Cleveland area. The Cleveland School District is the largest school district in the region, and employs almost 7,000 staff. There are around 21,000 teachers in the Metro Area, teaching approximately 330,000 students.

Insurance
The area's largest insurance company is Progressive Insurance, an international car insurance corporation, which is based in the suburb of Mayfield. 8,379 people are employed by Progressive in the region. However, Progressive's rivals, including State Farm, Allstate, Nationwide, and Geico are also prominent in Greater Cleveland.

Manufacturing
Northeast Ohio's economy was dominated by manufacturing up until the mid 20th century. Between 1990 and 2012, the area experienced a 41 percent decline in manufacturing jobs. More recently manufacturing, especially of steel, has been on a slight upswing. A study from Cleveland State has shown a bounce back after the Great Recession for the manufacturing industry. Between 2010 and 2012, the area saw a net growth in manufacturing jobs, the first time in a decade.

Healthcare

Greater Cleveland's economy has shifted to an economy of medicine and health. The two largest employers in Cuyahoga County are Cleveland Clinic and University Hospitals, respectively. Both are major factors in the region's economy. University Hospitals is estimated to have a $7.7 billion impact on Ohio's economy. Cleveland Clinic's impact on the statewide economy is $17.8 billion. Between 1990 and 2012, 107,000 healthcare related jobs were created in the region, a 55% increase. Healthcare related jobs have surpassed the number of manufacturing related jobs in the area. Greater Cleveland health care industry is a major sector of the local economy.

Sports
Sports are another factor of the local economy in Northeast Ohio. All three of the Big 4 teams located in Cleveland generate a major economic impact. The Cleveland Browns are considered to have a less of a positive economic impact on the city, both due to the fact that they only play 8 games in the stadium a year, far less than the Cavs and Indians, and because of their poor playing. The Cleveland Indians' strong performance in recent years has helped the local economy. Postseason home games were estimated to have a $3 million economic impact, and home World Series games had an estimated $10 million economic impact. LeBron James, a former Cleveland Cavaliers superstar, was also a factor of Cleveland's economy, more specifically near the FieldHouse. The Cavaliers’ successes in the mid 2010s have generated positive results for the area's economy.

Tech
The technology industry is prominent in Greater Cleveland, specifically health related technology. According to Forbes, Cleveland could be the next tech hub. 180 tech companies have started in the local area. Cleveland's economy is often said to be transitioning from a manufacturing based economy to a health-tech based economy.

See also
 Economy of Ohio
 Greater Cleveland

References

External links 
 Greater Cleveland Partnership
 Federal Reserve Bank of Cleveland

Economy of Cleveland